Wandle Park may refer to one of two separate parks in London, England, both on the course of the River Wandle and on the Wandle Trail:

 Wandle Park, Croydon
 Wandle Park, Merton